Werauhia attenuata is a plant species in the genus Werauhia. This species is native to Costa Rica.

References

attenuata
Flora of Costa Rica